Klein Agelo is a hamlet in the Dutch province of Overijssel. It is a part of the municipality of Dinkelland, and lies about 10 km north of Oldenzaal and very close to Ootmarsum.

It was first mentioned in 1408 as "Luttiken Agele". It is called Klein (Little) to distinguish from Groot Agelo (Big). Since 2009, both hamlets are listed under Agelo. Klein Agelo is mentioned on direction signs, however there are no place name signs to indicate that you have arrived in the hamlet.

In the rural countryside some good examples can be found of timber framed barns and farmhouses build in the local traditional style of the Low German house.

Gallery

References

Populated places in Overijssel
Dinkelland